The 2021–22 season was the 34th season of Churchill Brothers in existence and thirteenth in the I-League. A new coach for the team, Antonio Rueda, was appointed on 19 February 2022.

Transfers 

In

Out

I-League

Current squad

First team squad

Technical staff

Competitions

I-League

Squad statistics 
Churchill Brothers used a total of 26  players during the 2021–22 season and there were seven different goalscorers. Lamgoulen Hangshing and Richard Costa played in all 18 matches with former starting in all of them, the latter in 14. Kenneth Ikechukwu was the highest scorer with ten goals.

Key

No. = Squad number

Pos. = Playing position

Apps = Appearances

GK = Goalkeeper

DF = Defender

MF = Midfielder

FW = Forward

 = Yellow cards

 = Red cards

Numbers in parentheses denote appearances as substitute. Players with name struck through and marked  left the club during the playing season.

Source:

References

Churchill Brothers FC Goa seasons
2021–22 I-League by team